Rick Johnson may refer to:

People
Rick Johnson (Canadian politician), Ontario Liberal Party Member of Provincial Parliament for Haliburton—Kawartha Lakes—Brock
Rick Johnson (Michigan politician), served as Speaker of the Michigan House of Representatives (2001–2004)
Rick Johnson (offensive lineman) (born 1963), American football player
Rick Johnson (musician) (born 1980), American musician and bass player
Rick Johnson (programmer), game developer of Black Crypt
Rick Johnson (quarterback) (born 1961), American actor and director, and former CFL and USFL quarterback
Rick Johnson (writer) (born 1956), Christian author and speaker

Fictional characters
Rick Johnson (A Nightmare on Elm Street), in the A Nightmare on Elm Street film series

See also
Ricky Johnson (born 1964), American motocross, NASCAR and off-road racer
Dick Johnson (disambiguation)
Rich Johnson (disambiguation)
Richard Johnson (disambiguation)